This is a list of museums in Uruguay.

 Museo del Hombre y la Tecnología
 Juan Manuel Blanes Museum
 Museo de la Casa de Luis Alberto de Herrera
 Museum of the sea (Uruguay)
 Museo Torres García
 National Museum of Natural History, Uruguay
 National Museum of Visual Arts (Uruguay)
 Story of the Andes Survivors Museum
 Museo de Artes Decorativas (Palacio Taranco)
 Museo de Arte Precolombino e Indigena (Montevideo - Uruguay)
 Museo Paleontologico (Colonia del Sacramento - Uruguay)
 Colonel Jaime Meregalli Aeronautical Museum

See also 

 List of museums in Montevideo
 List of museums by country

Uruguay
 
Museums
Museums
Uruguay
Museums